Visarion was the Metropolitan of Herzegovina between 1590 and 1602.

He was the ktitor of the Great Church of the Tvrdoš Monastery in Trebinje, where he was seated.

Life

Rebel activity
The Banat Uprising (1594), in which the Serbs in Banat rose up against the Ottomans, had been aided by Visarion and Metropolitan Rufim Njeguš of Cetinje. The rebels' war flags with the icon of Saint Sava had been consecrated by Serbian Patriarch Jovan Kantul. Ottoman Grand Vizier Koca Sinan Pasha ordered the flag of Prophet Muhammad be brought to counter the Serb flag, as well as the sarcophagus and relics of Saint Sava located in the Mileševa monastery be brought by military convoy to Belgrade. Along the way, the Ottomans had people killed in their path so that the rebels in the woods would hear of it. The relics were publicly incinerated by the Ottomans on a pyre on the Vračar plateau, and the ashes scattered, on April 27, 1595.

Among the Serbs, especially after the incineration of the relics of St. Sava, the liberation movement met a large response. The center of action for Herzegovina was since 1596 the Tvrdoš Monastery in Trebinje, where Metropolitan Visarion was seated. Many of the Orthodox bishops called to Austria for help in liberating their lands. In 1596 the liberation movement and fighting would spread into Ottoman Montenegro and the neighbouring tribes in Herzegovina, especially under influence of Metropolitan Visarion. A Ragusan document from the beginning of 1596 claimed that the metropolitan and many Herzegovinian chieftains gathered in the Trebinje Monastery where they swore oath "to give up and donate 20,000 heroes to the [Austrian] emperors' light." The rebels sought help or at least, symbolically, the Austrian flag as a proof of connection with Austria.  At the end of 1596, after the Himariote rebellion, the Serbs started to revolt. The uprising broke out in Bjelopavlići, then spread to Drobnjaci, Nikšić, Piva and Gacko, and was led by vojvoda Grdan of Nikšić. The uprising was short-lived, as the rebels were defeated at Gacko. The rebels were forced to capitulate due to lack of foreign support. After the failure of the uprising, many Herzegovinians moved to the Bay of Kotor and Dalmatia. Grdan and Patriarch Jovan would continue to plan revolts against the Ottomans in the coming years.

References

16th-century Serbian people
17th-century Serbian people
16th-century Eastern Orthodox bishops
17th-century Eastern Orthodox bishops
Bishops of Zahumlje-Herzegovina
History of the Serbian Orthodox Church in Bosnia and Herzegovina
History of the Serbian Orthodox Church in Montenegro
Serbs of Bosnia and Herzegovina
17th-century deaths
Date of birth unknown
Ottoman period in the history of Montenegro
Religion in Bosnia and Herzegovina during Ottoman period
People from Trebinje
16th-century people from the Ottoman Empire